Mikhail Pavlovich Sushkov (7 January 1899 – 6 December 1983) was a Russian footballer, playing as a striker or midfielder, and soccer coach.

In 1915 he began his playing career at the Moscow team Mamontovka, where the next year he went to SKZ Moscow. He participated in the Russian Civil War. In 1923, he joined Yacht-Club Raykomvoda Moscow. Then he played for the clubs MSFC Moscow, Tryokhgorka Moscow, AMO Moscow, Rabis Moscow and Dukat Moscow. In 1935 he moved to Dinamo Sverdlovsk, where he made his debut in 1937 in the Class D championship of the USSR. After the season, he ended his playing career in 1937.

He defended the team colors of Moscow (1922–1924, 1927–1928), the representation of Trade Unions in Moscow and the Russian SFSR and the representation of Sverdlovsk (1935, captain). He was a participant of the Russian SFSR championship in 1935. He appeared in the match against Turkey.

While still a player in the years 1935-1937 he also began coaching at Dinamo Sverdlovsk. In the years 1938-1940 and in 1945 he coached the club Lokomotiv Moscow. In 1941, led the newly established club Profsoyuzy-1 Moscow, and in 1946 Dinamo Yerevan. In August 1948 he was appointed head coach of Dynamo Kiev, with whom he worked until the end of the year. From 1960-1962 he trained with Tekstilshchik Ivanovo. From 1947 to 1953 he worked intermittently as a head coach of the Faculty of Sport Football Committee of the USSR, in the years 1954 to 1955 lecturer at the Institute of Physical Culture in Beijing, the national coach 1956-1957 of the Faculty of Sport Football Committee Russian SFSR in 1956-1957 Director of Football and Hockey Central Council of Sport Society "Trud", in the years 1964-1983 the chairman and president of a national junior Dziecinno-Club and from 1968–1973, chairman of the Football Federation of USSR. He was also author of many scientific and methodological manuals for football and the book "Football theater" (Moscow, 1981). He died on December 6, 1983 in Moscow at the age of 84.

He was awarded the title Honoured Master of Sports of the USSR in 1948 and awarded the Order of Friendship of Peoples in 1979.

References

1899 births
1983 deaths
Russian footballers
Soviet football managers
Soviet footballers
FC Torpedo Moscow players
FC Lokomotiv Moscow managers
FC Ararat Yerevan managers
FC Dynamo Kyiv managers
Association football forwards